Plectrogenium, is a genus of marine ray-finned fishes, the stinger flatheads, the only genus classified within the subfamily Plectrogeninae, which in turn is classified within the family Scorpaenidae.  This genus is found in the Indian and Pacific Oceans.

Taxonomy
Plectrogenium was originally named as a monotypic genus in 1905 by the American ichthyologist Charles Henry Gilbert when he described what was then considered to be its only species, Plectrogenium nanum, from Hawaii. Plectrogenium is the only genus in the monotypic subfamily Plectrogeninae which is classified within the family Scorpaenidae in the order Scorpaeniformes by some authorities. Other authorities treat this taxon as part of a separate family Plectrogenidae, alongside the genus Bembradium, and place this family in the perciform suborder Platycephaloidei. The genus name,  Plectrogenium, is a compound of plectro, which means “spur”, and genys, which means “cheek”or “chin”, an allusion to the lines of robust spines along the sides of the head.

Species
The currently recognized species in this genus are:
 Plectrogenium barsukovi Mandritsa, 1992
 Plectrogenium capricornis Matsunuma, Uesaka, Yamakawa & Endo, 2021
 Plectrogenium kamoharai Uesaka, Yamakawa, Matsunuma & Endo, 2021
 Plectrogenium kanayamai Uesaka, Yamakawa, Matsunuma & Endo, 2021
 Plectrogenium longipinnis Matsunuma, Uesaka, Yamakawa & Endo, 2021
 Plectrogenium megalops Matsunuma, Uesaka, Yamakawa & Endo, 2021
 Plectrogenium nanum C. H. Gilbert, 1905
 Plectrogenium occidentalise Matsunuma, Uesaka, Yamakawa & Endo, 2021
 Plectrogenium rubricauda Matsunuma, Uesaka, Yamakawa & Endo, 2021
 Plectrogenium serratum Matsunuma, Uesaka, Yamakawa & Endo, 2021

Characteristics
Plectrogenium is characterised by having a laterally compressed body with a number of spines and ridges on the head. There are venom glands on the spines in the dorsal, anal and pelvic fins. The dorsal fin typically has 12 spines and 71/2 soft rays, the dorsal fin is split into 2 fins with 2 spines in the anterior part of the second dorsal fin. There are between 22 and 25 rays in the pectoral fins and they have 30-35 vertical rows of ctenoid scales on the body. There are flattened spines on the suborbital ridge which resembles that of the Platycephalidae. The mouth is positioned ventrally. They are small fishes with standard lengths of less than

Distribution and habitat
Plectrogenium is found in the Indian and Pacific Oceans from Madagascar to Hawaii. They are bathydemersal fishes which are found at depths greater then .

References

Scorpaenidae
Marine fish genera
Taxa named by Charles Henry Gilbert